Awad Moukhtar Halloudah (20 February 1931 – 6 January 2017) was an Egyptian swimmer. He competed in the men's 200 metre breaststroke at the 1952 Summer Olympics.

References

External links

1931 births
2017 deaths
Egyptian male swimmers
Olympic swimmers of Egypt
Swimmers at the 1952 Summer Olympics